Leontari (before 1930: Κασκαβέλι - Kaskaveli) is a town in the municipal unit of Thespies in Boeotia, Greece.

History
The city of Leontari was founded at the end of the 14th or beginning of the 15th century by Albanian settlers, the so-called Arvanites, under the leadership of Zogra Kobili. Leontari was first attested as hamlet in the Ottoman census of 1466. Initially the village was named after its founder. Later, and until 1930, the town was named Kaskaveli or Kobili, variants of the name of the founder. In 1930 it was renamed to Leontari ("Lion" in Greek) after an ancient Greek artifact possibly related to the area.

Demographics

Notable people 
Aristeidis Kollias, Lawyer, Folklorist and Historian.

References

Populated places in Boeotia
Arvanite settlements